The CSS General Polk (known casually as the Polk) was a vessel of the Confederate navy during the American Civil War. Originally a side-wheel river steamer built in 1852 named either Ed Howard or merely Howard, she was purchased for $8,000 by the Confederacy in 1861 and outfitted for service as a timberclad river gunboat. Under the command of Flag Officer George N. Hollins, she fought at the Battle of Lucas Bend as well as the at the Battle of Kentucky Bend shortly after. She also served in defence of Columbus, Kentucky and the Mississippi River. Being given to Lieutenant Jonathan H. Carter thereafter, she served at New Madrid, Missouri before returning to New Orleans. Following Union victory she was burned near Yazoo City on June 26, 1862.

Notes

1852 ships
Gunboats of the Confederate States Navy
Shipwrecks of the American Civil War
Shipwrecks in rivers
Maritime incidents in June 1862